Tiago Miguel Hora Ribeiro (born 14 March 2002) is a Portuguese professional footballer who plays mainly as a defensive midfielder for Paços de Ferreira, on loan from Monaco.

Club career
A youth product of Porto, Ribeiro joined the youth academy of Monaco in 2018. He worked his way up their youth category, making senior debut with their reserves in 2020 in the Championnat National 2. He made his professional debut with the senior Monaco team in a 3–2 Ligue 1 loss to Montepellier on 23 January 2022, coming on as a late sub in the 89th minute.

International career
Ribeiro is a youth international for Portugal, having represented them at the Portugal U15, U16, U17,U18, and U20 levels.

Personal life
His father Sérgio and his brother, also named Sérgio, also played football professionally.

References

External links
 
 

2002 births
Sportspeople from Vila Nova de Gaia
Living people
Portuguese footballers
Portugal youth international footballers
Association football midfielders
AS Monaco FC players
Valencia CF Mestalla footballers
Ligue 1 players
Championnat National 2 players
Segunda Federación players
Portuguese expatriate footballers
Expatriate footballers in Monaco
Portuguese expatriate sportspeople in Monaco
Expatriate footballers in Spain
Portuguese expatriate sportspeople in Spain